Spiersbridge railway station, also known as Speirsbridge railway station, co-served the neighbourhood of Jenny Lind, historically in Lanarkshire, Scotland, from 1848 to 1849 on the Glasgow, Barrhead and Neilston Direct Railway.

History
The station was opened on 27 September 1848 by the Glasgow, Barrhead and Neilston Direct Railway. It was a short-lived station, only being open for 7 months, before closing on 1 May 1849.

References

Disused railway stations in Glasgow
Railway stations in Great Britain opened in 1848
Railway stations in Great Britain closed in 1849
1848 establishments in Scotland
1849 disestablishments in Scotland